Spodnje Mestinje is a settlement in the Municipality of Šmarje pri Jelšah in eastern Slovenia. It lies just west of the regional road from Šmarje to Podčetrtek. The area is part of the historical Styria region. The entire municipality is now included in the Savinja Statistical Region.

References

External links
Spodnje Mestinje at Geopedia

Populated places in the Municipality of Šmarje pri Jelšah